The 1982 United States Senate election in Connecticut took place on November 2, 1982. Incumbent Republican U.S. Senator Lowell Weicker won re-election to a third term. He first defeated a challenge from Republican Prescott Bush Jr., the brother of Vice President George H. W. Bush and son of former Senator Prescott Bush, and then won the general election against Democratic U.S. Representative Toby Moffett.

, this was the last time the Republicans won a U.S. Senate election in Connecticut.

Republican nomination

Candidates
Lowell Weicker, incumbent U.S. Senator since 1971 and heir to the Squibb drug fortune

Withdrew
Prescott Bush Jr., insurance executive at Johnson & Higgins, son of former Senator Prescott Bush and brother of Vice President George Bush (endorsed Weicker following convention)
Robin Moore, author of The French Connection and The Green Berets (endorsed Bush)
Bradford Peery, financial analyst

Campaign
Prescott Bush announced his challenge to Senator Weicker on January 14 at the Old State House. Though the Reagan-Bush White House remained aloof from his campaign, he centered his message on his support for Reagan's policies and Weicker's "maverick" reputation.

Bush drew controversy in early March at a meeting of the Greenwich Republican Women's Club in Weicker's hometown, when he commented with regard to illegal aliens: "I'm sure there are people in Greenwich who are glad they're here, because they wouldn't have someone to help in the house without them." Bush's campaign manager initially stated that the comment was "not in touch" and "didn't sound like Prescott Bush," but Bush himself latter admitted to saying it "jokingly" and expressed his concern that "there are a lot of these Mexicans, Colombians working in just about every community in the state."

In the first mid-March delegate election caucus in Fairfield, Bush swept all 17 delegates. Notably, the Fairfield caucus was the state's only one in which all registered Republicans could vote. Weicker's aides remarked the town was "Bush country," though they were surprised by the Senator's poor performance. Bush himself referred to the vote as "an overwhelming rejection" of Weicker. The Senator's campaign nonetheless suggested he would win "between 70 and 80 percent of the delegates at the convention." Polling also suggested that Weicker was the stronger candidate against Toby Moffett, the likely Democratic nominee.

Soon after, author Robin Moore withdrew from the race and endorsed Bush.

Late in the pre-convention race on July 17, state party chairman Ralph E. Capecelatro surprised many by endorsing Weicker on the grounds that Bush could not beat Moffett in November. Prior to his endorsement, many insiders believed Capecelatro was quietly supporting Bush. Soon thereafter, former party chair Jo McKenzie, who held an honorary position in the Bush campaign, endorsed Weicker as well, as did two former Bush campaign coordinators. The embrace by the party establishment came despite Weicker's long-standing feud with the state party and his denunciation of it as a "country club." Polling showed that Moffett led Bush by 12 points in the general election, but Bush called the contention that he could not win the election a "myth."

Convention
Entering the convention, Weicker maintained his confidence that he would win the party endorsement but admitted that Bush would probably win the 20% necessary to force a September 7 primary contest. Bush described his chances of winning as "a long shot," but predicted he would be able to force a primary.

The keynote speaker was Governor Tom Kean of New Jersey, who encouraged unity and stressed support for President Reagan and "new federalism." Speeches for the candidates were delivered by Roger Eddy, state party treasurer, for Weicker and John O'Connell, a Hartford city councilman, for Bush. Eddy referred to Bush's candidacy as a "dangerous joke" and the convention as a "Republican trial, and inquisition." O'Connell denounced Weicker as a man who "constitently spurns both his President and his party" and "believes that we can best solve the problems of the 1980s through confrontation and obstruction."

Bush easily won enough votes to be eligible for a September primary against Weicker. Immediately following the convention vote, Bush said there was "no question" he would contest the primary. However, Bush soon withdrew from the race to the surprise of his own supporters and opponents. He cited his desire to unify the Republican Party in advance of the general election. He had met with senior Republican Party officials after the convention, but denied pressure from the national party or the White House. Polls indicated that Bush led Weicker in a potential primary, but the race would have been expensive for both candidates and weakened the winner before facing Moffett.

Democratic nomination

Candidates
Toby Moffett, U.S. Representative from Unionville

Withdrew
John T. Downey, Commissioner of the Connecticut Public Utility Control Authority and a former Central Intelligence Agency operative. He was shot down over China during the Korean War and was held prisoner for over twenty years.

Results

See also 
 1982 United States Senate elections

References 

Connecticut
1982
1982 Connecticut elections